The Red Elvises (also known as Igor and Red Elvises, after founding member and bandleader Igor Yuzov) are a Russian-American band that performs funk rock, surf, rockabilly, reggae, folk rock, disco and traditional Russian styles of music. They were founded in California in the mid-1990s and are based in Los Angeles.

Early history 
The Red Elvises were founded in 1995 by Igor Yuzov, Oleg Bernov, Zhenya Rock. Igor and Oleg met during a Russian-American peace walk and subsequently played together in a Russian folk-rock band called Limpopo. The band's third original member, guitarist Zhenya Rock (a.k.a. Kolykhanov), had also emigrated to America and had been the lead guitarist of the Red Elvises until 2004. For the first few months Andrey Baranov was the band's drummer, but within that year, the first American in the band, drummer Avi Sills from Austin, Texas, was added to the lineup. Band first began as an LA street Santa Monica's 3rd Street Promenade.

1995–2001 
When they weren't playing on the road they were busy recording and self-producing their own CDs. Grooving To The Moscow Beat was the band's first release in 1996, followed by Surfing In Siberia in 1997. In 1998, the band released their breakthrough CD, I Wanna See You Bellydance. Their music filled the soundtrack of Lance Mungia's independent film released in 1998, Six-String Samurai soundtrack and episode acting. With Mungia directing, the band also produced two music videos of songs from the Six-String Samurai soundtrack, "Lovepipe" and "Boogie on the Beach", that year. A full-length concert video, Live on the Pacific Ocean, was also released, showcasing their appearance at the Santa Monica Pier's Twilight Summer Concert Series.

The TV  also beckoned with television show appearances, resulting in Red Elvises' guest spot in an episode of Fox television series Melrose Place (Episode #206, "Suspicion") which aired on November 9, 1998. Near the end of that year, they appeared on FX's Penn & Teller's Sin City Spectacular accompanied by Penn & Teller's show dancers, which aired in January 1999. They released three new recordings in 1999, two studio-produced and one live. The band's fourth and fifth studio albums, Better Than Sex and Russian Bellydance, a Russian-language version of their smash album I Wanna See You Bellydance from the previous year, were both released in March 1999. Later in that same month, Red Elvises' performance in San Francisco was released as the band's first live double album, Live at the Great American Music Hall.

In the summer of 1999, the FX television channel hired Red Elvises to play in Malibu on the beach for their Beverly Hills, 90210 Swimsuit Beach Party highlighting a marathon airing of syndicated episodes of the hit series. FX held and flew the winners and ten of their friends to the beach party to appear on TV and dance to the band's music. Later, they provided the theme, score, and songs for the Cartoon Network animated series Mike, Lu & Og. February 2000 heralded a brief change in musical direction for the band with the release of their seventh CD, Shake Your Pelvis, a more electronic techno/disco style CD that greatly differed from their earlier releases. December 2000 also saw an end to Avi Sills' association with the band with his decision to move on to other musical opportunities.

2001–2008 
In 2001 the band worked as a trio with Oleg Bernov on drums, Igor Yuzov on electric bass guitar and Zhenya Rock as lead guitarist.
In March 2001 two studio CDs were released, Welcome to the Freakshow, written entirely by Yuzov, and Bedroom Boogie, written entirely by Zhenya Rock. The group continued to tour America throughout the year and was also invited to tour Russia.

In 2002, Rokenrol was recorded entirely in Russian, with the exception of two songs (Juliet by I.Yuzov and Sunshine by Z.Rock) in English. Zhenya Rock began a side project, Zeerok, going in a completely different musical direction, and, by the end of the year, decided to commit to his new band full-time, announcing his departure from Red Elvises. The band kept busy during the summer months with a tour through Russia that included some filming for the film , a romantic action comedy starring Danny Aiello, Vincent Pastore, Ivana Milocevich, and Robert Capelli, Jr., returning home in August to record the soundtrack. The band also returned to television with an appearance playing themselves in an episode of the Fox action series Fastlane (Episode #3 "Gone Native").
In 2003, Yuzov switched back to guitar, this time on lead, and Bernov returned to the large bass balalaika. Completing the new lineup was another Russian, Oleg "Schramm" Gorbunov on keyboards and accordion and new American drummer Adam Gust. 
In 2005, they were asked to perform in the Moscow Live8 concert, along with the Pet Shop Boys and a number of local performers. In 2006, Elena Shemankova from Moscow, the first female to ever play with Red Elvises, joined the band on keyboards and was very well received. The next year they were joined by female guitarist Beth Garner from Texas, who was with them for two American tours that year.

2009 to present 
In early 2009, the Red Elvises announced that longtime member and bassist Bernov had decided to leave the band. Subsequent postings on their website announced either that he was on a "friendly break" or had gone on to start his own group. In February 2009, Bernov announced that he had joined the star-up project of the now world-famous show Slava's Snowshow staged by Russian performance artist Slava Polunin, in which Bernov plays a stage role.

Later that month, Yuzov rolled out a new line-up called "Igor and Red Elvises". The first performance under this new name took place at Rusty's in Santa Monica. The concert was attended mainly by new members of the group (except for Yuzov and Gust). In April of the same year, they celebrated the anniversary of the founding of the group with free concerts on the embankment of 3rd Street in Santa Monica, for which Bernov temporarily rejoined the group.
Bern also joined the Red Elvises on keyboards and accordion for a tour in March 2010. Igor and Red Elvises continue the 2010 tour with core members Igor Yuzov on guitar, Oleg Bernov on bass balalaika, and Sarah Johnson on saxophone and keyboards. 
In September 2014, the band released their 12th studio album, Bacon. This would be the first non-live album released under the new name "Igor and Red Elvises". In December 2014, Bernov again departed the band and continued his solo career.

Success and tours in Russia 
In 1999 and 2002, Red Elvises released CDs in Russian, which were successful in Russia. Since 2002, the group annually goes on tour to Russia, where they usually spend two summer months, playing in clubs in major cities such as Moscow and Saint Petersburg, as well as in their hometown of Yuzov in Odesa in Ukraine.

Discography

Studio albums 
Grooving to the Moscow Beat (1996)
Surfing In Siberia (1997)
I Wanna See You Bellydance (1998)
Russian Bellydance (1999)
Better Than Sex (1999)
Shake Your Pelvis (2000)
Bedroom Boogie (2001)
Welcome to the Freakshow (2001)
Rokenrol (2002)
Lunatics and Poets (2004)
Drinking with Jesus (2009)
Bacon (2014)
She Works for KGB (2017)

Others 
"Crazy Russian Folk And Roll" (as Limpopo) (1992)
Give Us a Break (as Limpopo) (1995)
Six-String Samurai soundtrack (1998)
Your Favorite Band Live (live album) (2000)
Elvis Has Not Left the Building (Live In Moscow 2004) /The Best Of Kick-Ass
30 Greatest Hits (greatest hits compilation) (2007)
Made In Santa Monica (Russian compilation) (2008)
Igor & Red Elvises - Live in Montana (live album) (2012)

Videography 
Live On The Pacific Ocean (1997, VHS)
Live In Moscow (2006, DVD)

Film and television appearances

Founding members 
Igor Yuzov
Oleg Bernov
Zhenya Rock (Kolykhanov)

Touring members

2019 Moscow tour 
Pavel Voyskov (drums)
Timur Popovkin (bass)
Elena Shemankova (keyboard)
Yury Krivoshein (guitar)

Current US Touring Band 
Igor Yuzov (guitar)

Crazy Tomes (Guitar, Vocals, Keyboard) (2020 - present)

See also 
 Leningrad Cowboys
 Katzenjammer

References

External links 
 The official Red Elvises website
 

Rock music groups from California
Russian rock music groups
1995 establishments in California
Musical groups established in 1995
Musical groups from Los Angeles